Heinrich von Friedberg (27 January 1813 – 2 June 1895) was a German jurist and statesman.

Friedberg was born in Märkisch Friedland in West Prussia. He studied law at the University of Berlin, earning his degree in 1836. He was attached to the Kammergericht at Berlin, where he became district attorney in 1848. Transferred to Greifswald, he was appointed (1850) attorney, and became privatdozent at the university. In 1854 he was called to the Prussian Department of Justice in Berlin. He became a member of the Prussian House of Lords (1872); assistant secretary of the Prussian Department of Justice (1873); "Kronsyndikus" (treasurer of the crown of Prussia (1875); German secretary of justice (Reichsjustizminister) (1876); and received the same portfolio for Prussia (1879). In 1888 he was knighted and decorated with the Prussian Order of the Black Eagle by Emperor Frederick III. He resigned from his official positions in 1889.

Friedberg became a Protestant early in his career. He died in Berlin. Among his works may be mentioned "Entwurf einer Deutschen Strafprozessordnung", Berlin, 1873

See also 
 List of German justice ministers

References 
 

1813 births
1895 deaths
People from Mirosławiec
Jurists from Berlin
Members of the Prussian House of Lords
Academic staff of the University of Greifswald
German untitled nobility
German Lutherans
Converts to Protestantism from Judaism
19th-century German Jews
People from West Prussia
19th-century Lutherans
Justice ministers of Prussia